Kuran wa Munjan is one of the 28 districts of Badakhshan province in eastern Afghanistan.  Located in the Hindu Kush mountains, the district is home to approximately 8,000 residents. The district administrative center is Kuran wa Munjan.

The district is in the southwest corner of the province, and is bordered on its northeast side by the Jurm and Zebak Districts.  Most of the district's boundaries are adjacent to other Afghan provinces, but a very small section on the eastern edge of the district lies on the international border between Afghanistan and Pakistan.

The epicenter of the October 26 2015 Hindu Kush earthquake was 45 km north of here.  Famous valleys include the Koksha Valley, which is famous for its mines.

References

External links
Map at the Afghanistan Information Management Services

Districts of Badakhshan Province